Cargo of Eagles is a crime novel by Margery Allingham, first published in 1968, in the United Kingdom by Chatto & Windus, London. It was incomplete at her death in 1966 and completed by her husband Philip Youngman Carter. It is the nineteenth novel in the Albert Campion series.

Plot introduction
Saltey in Essex, the "Back Door to London", has a long history of smuggling, and holds a secret that leads to murder. Albert Campion sends his young American associate Mortimer Kelsey to mingle with the locals to try to solve the mystery.  The evidence points to a robbery from a yacht done years before by a dangerous criminal named Teague and his associates.

References 
 Margery Allingham, Cargo of Eagles, (London: Chatto & Windus, 1968)

External links 
An Allingham bibliography, with dates and publishers, from the UK Margery Allingham Society

1968 British novels
Novels by Margery Allingham
Novels set in Essex
Unfinished novels
Novels published posthumously
Chatto & Windus books